Holden Outerwear is a clothing manufacturer and brand that sells performance outerwear, such as jackets and pants. Based in Venice Beach, California, Holden was founded by snowboarder Mikey LeBlanc and designer Scott Zergebel.

Company
Holden was started in 2002 by LeBlanc and Zergebel as part of Earth Products, a subsidiary of K2 Sports and the larger Jarden Corporation. In 2007, Holden severed ties with Earth Products and became an independent company. LeBlanc and Zergebel moved the company from southern California to Portland, Oregon. In 2007, Holden was distributed in 150 stores in North America and 15 countries. 

In 2012, Holden moved its headquarters back to California. As of 2012, Holden is headquartered in Venice Beach, California.

Holden uses eco-friendly fabrics in its technical jackets, such as hemp and recycled plastic fabrics.

Videos
In 2009, LeBlanc and Holden team rider Darrell Mathes along with others, founded the video production company Videograss. The debut film, also titled Videograss, features the riding of the Holden team. The second video, titled Bon Voyage, was released in Fall of 2010.

References

External links
 Official website

Companies based in Portland, Oregon
Privately held companies based in Oregon
Clothing companies established in 2002
Outdoor clothing brands
Clothing companies of the United States
2002 establishments in Oregon